Daniel S. Hirschberg is a full professor in Computer Science at University of California, Irvine. His research interests are in the theory of design and analysis of algorithms.

He obtained his PhD in Computer Science from Princeton University in 1975.  He supervised the PhD dissertation of Lawrence L. Larmore.

He is best known for his 1975 and 1977 work on the longest common subsequence problem: Hirschberg's algorithm for this problem and for the related string edit distance problem solves it efficiently in only linear space. He is also known for his work in several other areas, including Distributed Algorithms. In Nancy Lynch's book Distributed Algorithms she gives details of an algorithm by Hirschberg and J. B. Sinclair for leader election in a synchronous ring. Lynch named this algorithm the HS algorithm, after its authors.

Selected publications

References

External links
 Dan Hirschberg's Webpage at UCI
 

American computer scientists
Living people
Princeton University alumni
University of California, Irvine faculty
Researchers in distributed computing
Theoretical computer scientists
Year of birth missing (living people)